Lalehabad Rural District is a rural district (dehestan) in Lalehabad District, Babol County, Mazandaran Province, Iran. At the 2006 census, its population was 17,197, in 4,533 families. The rural district has 29 villages.

References 

Rural Districts of Mazandaran Province
Babol County